Gideon's Spies: The Secret History of the Mossad is a 1999 book by Welsh author Gordon Thomas on the Mossad, the Israeli intelligence service. Two years previously Thomas wrote and narrated a major documentary for Channel Four – The Spy Machine – co-produced by Open Media and Israfilm. As Thomas's "Notes on Sources" afterword to Gideon's Spies makes clear, the research for the film provided him with some, but not all, of the sources and material he used when writing his later book independently of Channel 4 and the film-makers.

Gideon's Spies has so far been published in 16 languages. 

Sources for the book included Ari Ben-Menashe, a former Israeli intelligence agent, and Israeli spy Rafi Eitan. According to Charles Foster in Contemporary Review: "Writers who know their place are few and far between: fortunately Mr Thomas is one of them. By keeping to his place as a tremendous storyteller without a preacher's pretensions, he has put his book amongst the important chronicles of the state of Israel."

Claims 
In the book the author claimed that – eight months before Kenneth Starr had ever heard of Monica Lewinsky – the Israelis had about thirty hours of recorded tapes of President Bill Clinton talking intimately with her. It is also written that Tel Aviv was keeping these tapes either for blackmail or to defend its mole in White House, whose code name was "Mega." Daniel Pipes also criticized the book as inaccurate.

References

External links
 Reviewed by Daniel Pipes
 Reviews

1999 non-fiction books
Books about international relations
Books about the Mossad